Olav "Ole" Augunsen Aarnæs (May 27, 1888 – February 3, 1992) was a Norwegian high jumper.

He participated in the high jump competition at the 1912 Summer Olympics and cleared 1.75 metres but didn't qualify for the final. He never became Norwegian champion.

References

1888 births
1992 deaths
Norwegian male high jumpers
Athletes (track and field) at the 1912 Summer Olympics
Olympic athletes of Norway
Norwegian centenarians
Men centenarians
20th-century Norwegian people